Exim Bank or Export-Import Bank may refer to:
Exim Bank (Bangladesh), one of the leading private commercial banks in Bangladesh
Exim Bank (Comoros), a commercial bank in the Comoros
Exim Bank (Djibouti), a commercial bank in Djibouti
Exim Bank (India), a finance institution in India, established in 1982 under Export-Import Bank of India Act 1981
Eximbank (Moldova), a bank owned by Intesa Sanpaolo in Moldova 
EximBank (Romania), a bank in Romania based in Bucharest
Exim Bank (Tanzania), a commercial bank in Tanzania
Eximbank (Transnstria) (ОАО «Эксимбанк»), a state-owned bank in the unrecognised state of Transnistria
Exim Bank (Uganda), a commercial bank in Uganda
African Export–Import Bank, a Pan-African Multilateral Financial institution, headquartered in Cairo, Egypt
Exim Bank of China, a bank in the People's Republic of China
Japan Bank for International Cooperation, formerly Japan Export-Import Bank
Export–Import Bank of Korea, a bank in South Korea
Export–Import Bank of Malaysia, a commercial bank in Malaysia
Export–Import Bank of the Republic of China, a bank in the Republic of China (Taiwan)
Export–Import Bank of Thailand, a state-owned bank headquartered in Bangkok, Thailand
State Export-Import Bank of Ukraine
Export–Import Bank of the United States, the official export credit agency (ECA) of the United States federal government

Export credit agencies